Dorking is a market town in Surrey, England.

Dorking may also refer to:

Places
 Dorking (UK Parliament constituency), a former parliamentary constituency centred on the town of Dorking, Surrey
 Dorking railway station, one of three stations that serve the town of Dorking in Surrey, England
 Dorking, Ontario, Canada, a community
 Dorking Tye, Suffolk, England

Sport
 Dorking F.C., a football club based in Dorking, Surrey
 Dorking R.F.C., a rugby union football club originally based in Dorking, Surrey

Other uses
 Dorking chicken, a breed of chicken
 Google dorking, the use of advanced search parameters on Google
 , a Hunt-class minesweeper
 The Battle of Dorking: Reminiscences of a Volunteer (1871), a novella by George Tomkyns Chesney

See also
 Dorkin